{{DISPLAYTITLE:C23H28N2O}}
The molecular formula C23H28N2O (molar mass: 348.48 g/mol) may refer to:

 CUMYL-PICA (SGT-56)
 Cyclopropylfentanyl
 Iferanserin (VEN-309)
 NMP-7

Molecular formulas